Novopangaea or Novopangea (Greco-Latin for "New Pangaea") is a possible future supercontinent postulated by Roy Livermore in the late 1990s. It assumes closure of the Pacific, docking of Australia with East Asia, and northward motion of Antarctica.

Alternative scenarios 
Paleogeologist Ronald Blakey has described the next 15 to 100 million years of tectonic development as fairly settled and predictable but no supercontinent will form in that time frame. Beyond that, he cautions that the geologic record is full of unexpected shifts in tectonic activity that make further projections "very, very speculative". In addition to Novopangaea, two other hypothetical supercontinents—"Amasia" and Christopher Scotese's "Pangaea Ultima"—were illustrated in an October 2007 New Scientist article.

References

Further reading 
 Nield, Ted, Supercontinent: Ten Billion Years in the Life of Our Planet, Harvard University Press, 2009, 

 Livermore, Roy The Tectonic Plates are Moving, Oxford University Press, 2018

Future supercontinents